Toot Sweet is a live album by saxophonist Lee Konitz and pianist Michel Petrucciani which was recorded in Paris in 1982 and released on the French Owl label. The album was rereleased on CD in the US on Sunnyside.

Critical reception

The Allmusic review stated "This 1982 meeting between the veteran alto saxophonist Lee Konitz and the young pianist (19 at the time of the session) Michel Petrucciani is a success on all counts. Konitz's fragile alto is complemented by Petrucciani's lush backing".

Track listing 
 "I Hear a Rhapsody" (George Fragos, Jack Baker, Dick Gasparre) – 4:43
 "To Erlinda" (Michel Petrucciani) – 5:03
 "'Round About Midnight" (Thelonious Monk, Cootie Williams, Bernie Hanighen) – 16:00
 "Lover Man" (Jimmy Davis, Ram Ramirez, Jimmy Sherman) – 15:35
 "Ode" (Lee Konitz) – 4:46
 "Lovelee" (Konitz, Petrucciani) – 2:11

Personnel 
Lee Konitz – alto saxophone
Michel Petrucciani – piano

References 

Lee Konitz live albums
Michel Petrucciani live albums
1982 live albums
Sunnyside Records albums